Burnaby—Richmond (also known as Burnaby—Richmond—Delta) was a federal electoral district in British Columbia, Canada, that was represented in the House of Commons of Canada from 1949 to 1979.

This riding was created as "Burnaby—Richmond" in 1947 from parts of New Westminster and Vancouver North ridings.

The name of the electoral district was changed in 1970 to "Burnaby—Richmond—Delta".

It was abolished in 1976 when it was redistributed into Burnaby and Richmond—South Delta ridings.

Members of Parliament

Election results

See also 

 List of Canadian federal electoral districts
 Past Canadian electoral districts

External links

Riding history from the Library of Parliament:
Burnaby—Richmond, British Columbia (1947–1970)
Burnaby—Richmond—Delta, British Columbia (1970–1976)

Former federal electoral districts of British Columbia